Phtheochroa ingridae is a species of moth of the family Tortricidae. It is found in Italy.

The wingspan is 18–22 mm. Adults have been recorded on wing in May.

The larvae feed on Bryonia dioica.

References

Moths described in 1990
Phtheochroa